Billy Hartung, also known as Bill Hartung and William Hartung, is an American actor and dancer with credits ranging from Broadway to film.

Born in Pittsburgh, Pennsylvania in 1971, Hartung is a graduate of Seton-La Salle Catholic High School and received a BFA from Point Park University. He is a father of 6 children.

He made his acting debut in 1991 in the made-for-TV movie Guilty Until Proven Innocent.  In 1993, he made his big screen debut as a boat preppie in the movie Striking Distance, which was filmed in his hometown of Pittsburgh.

Hartung appeared in the original cast of the Broadway productions of Side Show, as Roustabout, and Footloose, as Chuck Cranston. He also appeared in the film version of Chicago.

References

External links
 
 
 Dance workshop profile

Living people
1971 births
American male stage actors
Male actors from Pittsburgh
American male film actors
Point Park University alumni